Epipremnum obtusum is a species of flowering plant belonging to the genus Epipremnum and the family Araceae.

It was first described by Adolf Engler and Kurt Krause.

Distribution and habitat
The plant occurs in New Guinea.

References

obtusum
Taxa named by Adolf Engler
Flora of Papua New Guinea
Plants described in 1916